Benjamin Thomas Rortvedt (born September 25, 1997) is an American professional baseball catcher for the New York Yankees of Major League Baseball (MLB). He previously played in MLB for the Minnesota Twins. He made his MLB debut in 2021.

Amateur career
Rortvedt attended Verona Area High School in Verona, Wisconsin. As a senior, he slashed .444/.568/.667. He committed to play college baseball at the University of Arkansas.

Professional career

Minnesota Twins
Rortvedt was selected by the Minnesota Twins in the second round, with the 56th overall selection, of the 2016 Major League Baseball draft. He signed with the Twins for a $900,000 signing bonus, forgoing his commitment to Arkansas.

Rortvedt made his professional debut that same year with the Gulf Coast League Twins before being promoted to the Elizabethton Twins. In 33 games between the two clubs, he batted .222 with ten RBIs. He spent 2017 with the Cedar Rapids Kernels where he compiled a .224 batting average with four home runs and 30 RBIs in 89 games, and 2018 with both Cedar Rapids and the Fort Myers Miracle, slashing a combined .262/.331/.379 with five home runs and 43 RBIs in 90 total games between the two clubs. He returned to Fort Myers to begin the 2019 season, and was promoted to the Pensacola Blue Wahoos in May, with whom he finished the year. Over 79 games between the two teams, he hit .238/.334/.379 with seven home runs and 29 RBIs. Rortvedt did not play a minor league game in 2020 due to the cancellation of the minor league season caused by the COVID-19 pandemic. The Twins added him to their 40-man roster after the 2020 season.

On April 30, 2021, Rortvedt was promoted to the major leagues for the first time. He made his MLB debut that day as the starting catcher against the Kansas City Royals. In the game, he recorded his first major league hit, an RBI single off of Royals reliever Wade Davis. He had a total of 89 at-bats over 2021 with the Twins, batting .169/.229/.281 with three home runs and seven RBIs. When not with the Twins, he played with the St. Paul Saints with whom he slashed .254/.324/.426 with five home runs and 22 RBIs over 34 games.

New York Yankees
On March 13, 2022, Rortvedt was traded, alongside Josh Donaldson and Isiah Kiner-Falefa, to the New York Yankees in exchange for Gary Sánchez and Gio Urshela.

On May 18, 2022, Rortvedt underwent arthroscopic knee surgery on his left knee to repair a partially torn meniscus. The procedure came with a recovery timetable of six-to-eight weeks. He was placed on the 60-day injured list on May 22.

References

External links

Living people
1997 births
People from Verona, Wisconsin
Baseball players from Wisconsin
Major League Baseball catchers
Minnesota Twins players
Gulf Coast Twins players
Elizabethton Twins players
Cedar Rapids Kernels players
Fort Myers Miracle players
Pensacola Blue Wahoos players
Salt River Rafters players
St. Paul Saints players